Stole may refer to:


Clothing
 Stole (shawl), a type of shawl, particularly one made of fur
 Stole (vestment), a Christian liturgical garment
 Academic stole, a garment worn at formal academic events such as graduation

People
 Stojan Stole Aranđelović (1930–1993), Serbian film actor
 Stole Dimitrievski (born 1993), Macedonian footballer
 Stole Janković (1925–1987), Serbian film director and screenwriter
 Stole Popov (born 1950), Macedonian film director
 Ole Bjørn Støle (1950–2010), Norwegian Supreme Court justice and lawyer
 Svein Støle (born 1963), Norwegian businessperson and former journalist

Other uses
 "Stole" (song), a 2002 song by American singer Kelly Rowland

See also 
 Stol (disambiguation)
 Stola (disambiguation)
 Stolen (disambiguation)
 Stoll (disambiguation)
 Stolle, a surname

 Masculine given names